Ary-Tit (Arıı Tiit) is a rural locality (a selo) in Borogonsky Rural Okrug of Ust-Aldansky District in the Sakha Republic, Russia, located  from Borogontsy, the administrative center of the district and  from Tumul, the administrative center of the rural okrug. Its population as of the 2002 Census was 181.

References

Notes

Sources
Official website of the Sakha Republic. Registry of the Administrative-Territorial Divisions of the Sakha Republic. Ust-Aldansky District. 

Rural localities in Ust-Aldansky District